Biljana Novović née Pavićević, (born 12 May 1988) is a former Montenegrin handball player for ŽRK Budućnost Podgorica and the Montenegrin national team.

References

1988 births
Living people
Montenegrin female handball players
Sportspeople from Podgorica
Handball players at the 2016 Summer Olympics
Olympic handball players of Montenegro